The 1959 Texas Tech Red Raiders football team represented Texas Technological College—now known as Texas Tech University—as an independent during the 1959 NCAA University Division football season. In their ninth season under head coach DeWitt Weaver, the Red Raiders compiled a 4–6 record and were outscored by opponents by a combined total of 158 to 139. The team's statistical leaders included Ken Talkington with 603 passing yards, Carl Gatlin with 211 rushing yards, and Bake Turner with 444 receiving yards. The team played its home games at Clifford B. and Audrey Jones Stadium.

Schedule

References

Texas Tech
Texas Tech Red Raiders football seasons
Texas Tech Red Raiders football